Herath Mudiyanselage Wasantha Samarasinghe is a Sri Lankan politician and a former member of the Parliament of Sri Lanka.

References

1976 births
Janatha Vimukthi Peramuna politicians
Living people
Members of the 13th Parliament of Sri Lanka
Sinhalese politicians
Sri Lankan Buddhists
United People's Freedom Alliance politicians